Chunsky District is an administrative district, one of the thirty-three in Irkutsk Oblast, Russia. Municipally, it is incorporated as Chunsky Municipal District. Its administrative center is the urban locality (a work settlement) of Chunsky. Population:  41,829 (2002 Census);  The population of the administrative center accounts for 41.1% of the district's total population.

References

Notes

Sources

Districts of Irkutsk Oblast